Jerome Joshua Federico (born 14 May 1992) is an English footballer who plays for Hanworth Villa.

Prior to this he had spells with Burnham, Woking, Wealdstone, Maidenhead United, Hayes & Yeading United, Hendon, Aylesbury, Dunstable Town, Northwood and Wycombe Wanderers where he began his career.

Career
A youth team player who, after impressing at county level, was offered terms by Norwich City choosing instead to sign for Wycombe Wanderers, Federico made his Wycombe debut on 28 September 2010, coming on as a 94th-minute substitute for Ben Strevens in Wycombe's 4–2 victory against Barnet.

Federico signed for Conference South side Woking on loan on 2 November 2010 on a one-month deal, followed by similar one-month loan deals at Wealdstone, signed on 28 January 2011, and Maidenhead United, signed on 3 March 2011. At the end of the 2010–11 season, Federico was released by Wycombe.

In July 2011, Federico was on trial at League One side Stevenage, coming on as a 60th-minute substitute in Stevenage's 1–0 win at Hitchin Town.

A month later, Federico went on trial at Conference National club Hayes & Yeading United, playing in a 2–0 friendly victory over Burnham. The trial proved to be successful, and Federico joined the club ahead of the 2011–12 season. He made his debut as an 89th-minute substitute in Hayes & Yeading's 3–1 home win against Alfreton Town on 13 August 2011.

He then joined Hendon in the summer of 2011 following his departure from Hayes & Yeading United, and briefly played one cup game with Northwood in the 2011–12 season. Federico then rejoined Northwood for a second time on dual registration in early 2013 and made his debut in the defeat to Aylesbury. Federico scored his first goals for the club in a 5–0 victory away against Woodford United on 2 February 2013.

However, in the summer of 2013 - after the conclusion of his loan spell at Northwood - Federico signed for Aylesbury from Hendon. Federico made his Aylesbury debut in a 3–1 defeat to A.F.C. Hayes on 17 August 2013.

In November 2013, Federico signed for Dunstable Town, but returned to Northwood in December 2013 making a scoring return in a win over North Greenford United. However, Federico moved on from Northwood at the end of the 2013/14 season.

During pre-season prior to the 2014/15 season, Federico spent time training and playing friendly matches with Isthmian League Premier Division side Hampton & Richmond Borough. The club later confirmed the signing of Federico as the sides first transfer of the summer. Federico made his Borough debut in their 1–0 loss to Margate on 9 August 2014.

In October 2017, he joined Cray Wanderers after a short spell with Kingstonian.

In 2021, Federico joined Combined Counties League side Hanworth Villa.

Career statistics

References

External links

Hendon stats at Greensnet
https://archive.today/20130216141600/http://www.northwoodfc.com/Reports%201213/Aylesbury-A.html

1992 births
Living people
English footballers
Sportspeople from Watford
Footballers from Hertfordshire
Association football wingers
Wycombe Wanderers F.C. players
Daventry Town F.C. players
Burnham F.C. players
Wealdstone F.C. players
Maidenhead United F.C. players
Hayes & Yeading United F.C. players
Hendon F.C. players
Aylesbury F.C. players
Dunstable Town F.C. players
Northwood F.C. players
Hampton & Richmond Borough F.C. players
Metropolitan Police F.C. players
Leatherhead F.C. players
Cray Wanderers F.C. players
Hanworth Villa F.C. players
English Football League players
National League (English football) players
Isthmian League players
Southern Football League players